The 2017 OFC Champions League Final was the final of the 2017 OFC Champions League, the 16th edition of the Oceania Cup, Oceania's premier club football tournament organized by the Oceania Football Confederation (OFC), and the 11th season under the current OFC Champions League name.

The final was contested in two-legged home-and-away format between two New Zealand teams, Auckland City and Team Wellington. The first leg was hosted by Auckland City at Kiwitea Street, Auckland on 30 April 2017, while the second leg was hosted by Team Wellington at David Farrington Park, Wellington on 7 May 2017. The winner would earn the right to represent the OFC at the 2017 FIFA Club World Cup, entering at the qualifying play-off round.

Auckland City won the first leg 3–0 and the second leg 2–0, to defeat Team Wellington 5–0 on aggregate and won the OFC Champions League seven years in a row and nine times in total.

Teams
In the following table, finals until 2006 were in the Oceania Club Championship era, since 2007 were in the OFC Champions League era.

The final was a rematch of the previous two season's finals, which were both played as a single match. Auckland City had won both finals, 4–3 on penalties (1–1 after extra time) in 2015, and 3–0 in 2016.

Auckland City were the six-time defending champions. They had played in eight previous finals, winning all of them in 2006, 2009, 2011, 2012, 2013, 2014, 2015, and 2016.

This was the third OFC club final for Team Wellington, following the defeats to Auckland City in 2015 and 2016.

Venues

David Farrington Park in Wellington, New Zealand hosted the second leg.

Road to the final

Note: In all results below, the score of the finalist is given first (H: home; A: away).

Format
The final was played on a home-and-away two-legged basis, with the order of legs decided by draw. If tied on aggregate, away goals were the first tie-breaker.

Matches

First leg

Second leg

References

External links
2017 OFC Champions League, oceaniafootball.com

Final
2017
1 Final
2016–17 in New Zealand association football